The 2019 Bryant Bulldogs football team represents Bryant University during the 2019 NCAA Division I FCS football season. They are led by first-year head coach Chris Merritt and play their home games at Beirne Stadium. They are a member of the Northeast Conference.

Previous season

The Bulldogs finished the 2018 season 6–5, 2–4 in NEC play to finish in a tie for fifth place.

Preseason

Preseason coaches' poll
The NEC released their preseason coaches' poll on July 24, 2019. The Bulldogs were picked to finish in fifth place.

Preseason All-NEC team
The Bulldogs had two players at two positions selected to the preseason all-NEC team.

Offense

Vincent Nisivoccia – WR

Defense

Tomas Wright – DL

Schedule

Game summaries

at Stony Brook

at Albany

Fordham

Brown

Saint Francis

at Merrimack

LIU

at Central Connecticut

at Robert Morris

Sacred Heart

Duquesne

at Wagner

References

Bryant
Bryant Bulldogs football seasons
Bryant Bulldogs football